Ewan Stafford Page (born 17 August 1928) is a British academic and computer scientist, and former vice-chancellor of the University of Reading.

Ewan Page was educated at Wyggeston Grammar School for Boys in Leicester and at Christ's College, Cambridge, where he graduated MA and PhD and won the Rayleigh Prize. After a period of National Service, he was a research student in the field of statistics at the University of Cambridge between 1951 and 1954, at a time when the EDSAC computer was new. In 1957, he was appointed as director of the Durham University's Computing Laboratory, located at King's College, Newcastle. When King's College became Newcastle University, the Computing Laboratory became part of that University, and eventually Ewan Page was appointed a pro-vice-chancellor. In 1976, when the then incumbent died unexpectedly, he served as acting vice-chancellor of Newcastle University.

In 1979, Ewan Page was appointed vice-chancellor of the University of Reading, a position he held until 1993. He served as president of the British Computer Society in 1984/5.

Books

References 

Page, Ewan Stafford
Computer scientists
Alumni of Christ's College, Cambridge
Page, Ewan Stafford
Page, Ewan Stafford